Slimm may refer to:
Slimm Calhoun
G-Slimm
Iceberg Slimm
Trayvon Martin

See also
 Slim (disambiguation)